National Highway 135BG, commonly referred to as NH 135BG is a national highway in India. It is a spur road of National Highway 35.  NH-135BG traverses the states of Madhya Pradesh and Uttar Pradesh in India.

Route 
Uttar Pradesh
Chitrakoot - M.P. border.

Madhya Pradesh
U.P. border - Majhgawan, Satna, Maihar.

Junctions  

  Terminal near Chitrakoot.
  Terminal near Maihar.

See also 
 List of National Highways in India
 List of National Highways in India by state

References

External links 

 NH135BG on OpenStreetMap

National highways in India
National Highways in Madhya Pradesh
National Highways in Uttar Pradesh